Kathleen is an unincorporated community in northern Alberta in the Municipal District of Smoky River No. 130, located on Highway 2,  northeast of Grande Prairie.

It is named after a relative of W. R Smith, general manager of the Edmonton, Dunvegan and British Columbia Railway

References

Localities in the Municipal District of Smoky River No. 130